The fourth season of Teenage Mutant Ninja Turtles is split into two main sub-sections that aired concurrently: thirteen episodes which aired daily in syndication, and twenty-six episodes that premiered in hour-long double-bills on Saturday Mornings on CBS, which would serve as its home for the remainder of the whole series. A brief "Turtle Tips" segment aired between the two episodes which served as a PSA about the environment or other issues. There were a total of 20 "Turtle Tips" segments produced and aired. The syndication episodes featured the original title sequence, while the CBS episodes debuted a new title sequence, and also did away with the show's title cards. In addition to these thirty-nine episodes, a two-part "Easter special" aired the following Spring.

During this season, the Technodrome is back in Dimension X, having been launched from Earth through a portal at the conclusion of season 3 . The season premiere, "Plan 6 from Outer Space", aired in syndication, and detailed how the villains' battle fortress crash-landed on an asteroid; in the later episode, "The Dimension X Story" a volcano on the asteroid erupted, immobilizing the Technodrome by surrounding it with molten lava. "The Dimension X Story" was evidently intended to be the first episode of the CBS run, as many other episodes which aired before it from both the syndication and CBS episodes refer to the Technodrome being trapped in lava, but wound up airing very late in the season.

Note that the Vacation in Europe episodes take place between the first two episodes of this season.

Episodes
 All forty-one fourth-season episodes were directed by Fred Wolf.

References

External links
TV Com
IMDB

Teenage Mutant Ninja Turtles (1987 TV series) seasons
1990 American television seasons
Fiction about asteroids
Universities and colleges in fiction
1991 in American television
Florida in fiction
Fiction about consciousness transfer
Older versions of cartoon characters
Time travel in television